The 2002–03 season was FK Partizan's 11th season in First League of Serbia and Montenegro. This article shows player statistics and all matches (official and friendly) that the club played during the 2002–03 season.

Players

Squad information

Squad statistics

Top scorers
Includes all competitive matches. The list is sorted by shirt number when total goals are equal.

Competitions

Overview

First League

Serbia and Montenegro Cup

Partizan  will participate in the 1st Serbia and Montenegro Cup starting in 1/16 Round.

UEFA Champions League

Second Qualifying Round

Third Qualifying Round

UEFA Cup

First round

Second round

References

FK Partizan seasons
Partizan
Serbian football championship-winning seasons